Acompsomyces is a genus of fungi in the family Laboulbeniaceae. A 2008 estimate placed seven species in the genus.

See also
List of Laboulbeniaceae genera

References

Laboulbeniales genera
Laboulbeniomycetes